Norfolk Tower on the north side of Surrey Street in Norwich, England is one of the city's tallest buildings. Standing at 45 metres tall, the building was completed in 1974. Former occupants of the building have included BBC Radio Norfolk and insurance company Norwich Union.

The upper floors four to ten are roughly 3,500 to  each and are mainly open plan. The core area is situated towards the front of the building.

The building was bought in March 2008 by the company Mahb Capital, which was founded by local businessmen Matt Bartram, John Maynard and Anthony Hunt.

Residents 
 BBC Radio Norfolk - 1980–2003
 Norwich Union - until 2008
 VoiceHost
 Proxama (Incorporating Hypertag)
 Smithfield Foods
 Balloon Dog
 NDI
 Cotswold Company
 Hewlett-Packard - until 2015
 Optimise
 MAHB

References

External links 
 skyscrapernews.com

Buildings and structures in Norwich
Office buildings completed in 1924